Nemertopsis is a genus of worms belonging to the family Emplectonematidae.

The genus has cosmopolitan distribution.

Species:

Nemertopsis bivittata 
Nemertopsis bullocki 
Nemertopsis capitulata 
Nemertopsis exilis 
Nemertopsis flavida 
Nemertopsis gracilis 
Nemertopsis mitellicola 
Nemertopsis quadripunctata 
Nemertopsis tenuis 
Nemertopsis tenuis 
Nemertopsis tetraclitophila

References

Nemerteans